Son of a Preacher Man is the third solo studio album by American country music artist John Rich, one half of the duo Big & Rich. Rich wrote or co-wrote all of the songs on the album. Originally slated for a May 2009 release on Warner Bros. Records, the same label to which Big & Rich are signed, Son of a Preacher Man was released on March 24, 2009.

Singles

"Another You"
The first single released from the album, "Another You", debuted on the Billboard Hot Country Songs chart at number 51 for the week of January 24, 2009. The song's chart run was supplanted by "Shuttin' Detroit Down", a last-minute addition to the album.

"Shuttin' Detroit Down"

"Shuttin' Detroit Down" was not originally planned to be included on Son of a Preacher Man. Rich co-wrote the song with fellow country singer John Anderson, and sent the song to radio in late January 2009, thus halting the chart run of "Another You". "Shuttin' Detroit Down" debuted at number 34 on the country charts, giving Rich his first solo Top 40 single of his career. It reached a peak of number 12 after nine weeks on the chart. After the release of "Shuttin' Detroit Down", the album's release date was moved up to March.

"The Good Lord and the Man"
"The Good Lord and the Man" is the third release to radio from Son of a Preacher Man. The single debuted at number 59 on the Hot Country Songs chart for the chart week of July 4, 2009. The single received a thumbs-down from Karlie Justus of Engine 145, who said, "Unfortunately, whatever authentic patriotism Rich conjures up in the opening verses is instantly discredited by the song’s uncomfortably off-putting chorus. Rich doesn’t effectively channel the emotions his grandfather’s service evokes within him and his phrasing and lyrics end up straining both rhythmically and logically to make his points." After a short chart run, it reached a peak of number 56.

Track listing

Personnel
 Max Abrams - saxophone
 Roy Agee - horn arrangements, trombone
 Larry Babb - drums
 Jimmy Bowland - flute
 Mike Brignardello - bass guitar
 Eric Darken - percussion
 Shannon Forrest - drums
 Wes Hightower - background vocals
 Mike Johnson - pedal steel guitar
 Liana Manis - background vocals 
 Steve Patrick - trumpet
 Mark Petaccia - percussion
 Ethan Pilzer - bass guitar
 Danny Rader - acoustic guitar
 John Rich - lead vocals
 Mike Rojas - Hammond B-3 organ, piano, synthesizer
 Adam Shoenfeld - electric guitar
 John Willis - acoustic guitar
 Gretchen Wilson - background vocals
 Glenn Worf - bass guitar
 Jonathan Yudkin - banjo, cello, fiddle, mandolin, octophone, string bass, string arrangements, viola, violin

Chart performance

Weekly charts

Year-end charts

Singles

References

2009 albums
John Rich albums
Warner Records albums
Albums produced by John Rich